The 1989 All-Pacific-10 Conference football team consists of American football players chosen by various organizations for All-Pacific-10 Conference teams for the 1989 college football season.

Offensive selections

Quarterbacks
Todd Marinovich, USC

Running backs
Steve Broussard, Washington St.
Leroy Holt, USC
Ricky Ervins, USC

Wide receivers
 John Jackson, USC
Ron Fair, Arizona St.

Tight ends
Scott Galbraith, USC

Tackles
Brad Leggett, USC
Bern Brostek, Washington

Guards
Glenn Parker, Arizona
Brent Parkinson, USC

Centers
John Husby, Washington St.

Defensive selections

Linemen
Tim Ryan, USC
Esera Tuaolo, Oregon St.
Dan Owens, USC
Anthony Smith, Arizona

Linebackers
Junior Seau, USC
Chris Singleton, Arizona
Scott Ross, USC
Dan Grayson, Washington St.
David Ortega, California

Defensive backs
Chris Oldham, Oregon
Mark Carrier, USC
Jeff Hammerschmidt, Arizona
Nathan LaDuke, Arizona St.

Special teams

Placekickers
Jason Hanson, Washington St.

Punters
Kirk Maggio, UCLA

Return specialists 
Chris Oldham, Oregon

Key

See also
1989 College Football All-America Team

References

All-Pacific-10 Conference Football Team
All-Pac-12 Conference football teams